Clear Lake is a lake located by Plessis, New York. Fish species present in the lake are largemouth bass, smallmouth bass, northern pike, walleye, yellow perch, black bullhead, bluegill, and black crappie. There is a boat launch on the west shore on Clear Lake Road.

References

Lakes of Jefferson County, New York
Lakes of New York (state)